Several monasteries in Syria, Lebanon and Turkey are dedicated to Mar Sarkis and Bakhos (Saints Sergius and Bacchus,).

These include:
 Monastery of Mar Sarkis and Bakhos, Tourza North Lebanon 
 Monastery of Mar Sarkis and Bakhos - Ras Al Nahr in Ehden, Lebanon. It belongs to the Lebanese Antonin Maronite Order since 1736.
 Monastery of Mar Sarkis - Bsharri. It belonged since the 16th Century to the Carmelite Fathers. In 1931, it was acquired by the family of Khalil Gibran, the famous Lebanese writer, poet and painter as a burial place. In 1975, the Gibran National Committee transformed the Monastery into the Gibran Museum for the works of Gibran.
 Monastery of Mar Sarkis, Maaloula, Syria.
 Monastery of Little Hagia Sophia, Istanbul, Turkey.

See also 

 Mar Sarkis, Maaloula — official website
 Mar Sarkis, Gibran Museum
 Antonin Maronite Order, Last reviewed on 10 November 2007.

Christian monasteries in Lebanon
Christian monasteries in Syria
Eastern Catholic monasteries in Syria